Miriam Vece (born 16 March 1997) is an Italian road and track cyclist, who currently rides for UCI Women's Continental Team . Representing Italy at international competitions, Vece competed at the 2016 UEC European Track Championships in the 500m time trial and team sprint events.

Major results
2015
 2nd Team sprint, UEC European Junior Track Championships
 3rd Team sprint, UCI Juniors Track World Championships
2016
Athens Track Grand Prix
1st 500m time trial
3rd Sprint
3rd Keirin
2017
1st 500m time trial, Cottbuser SprintCup
2nd Team sprint, GP von Deutschland im Sprint (with Elena Bissolati)
2018
 UEC European Under-23 Track Championships
1st  500m time trial
1st  Sprint
2nd Team sprint

References

External links

1997 births
Living people
Italian female cyclists
Italian track cyclists
People from Crema, Lombardy
Cyclists at the 2019 European Games
European Games medalists in cycling
European Games bronze medalists for Italy
Cyclists from the Province of Cremona
21st-century Italian women